The Walter Rand Transportation Center is a transportation hub located at Martin Luther King Boulevard and Broadway in Camden, New Jersey. It is served by the River Line, New Jersey Transit buses and Greyhound intercity buses and also includes the Broadway station of the PATCO Speedline.

History 

The Pennsylvania-Reading Seashore Lines (PRSL) had its Broadway station near the site. The Philadelphia Rapid Transit Bridge Line opened on June 7, 1936, with an underground Broadway station as its Camden terminus. After Camden Terminal closed in 1953, Broadway was the Camden terminus of the PRSL. PRSL service to Camden ended in 1965.

The Bridge Line was temporarily closed on December 28, 1968 for conversion into the PATCO Speedline. The Lindenwold–City Hall segment, including Broadway, reopened on January 4, 1969.

The surface-level bus transfer center opened on May 17, 1989 as Camden Transportation Center and was renamed in 1994 for Walter Rand, a former New Jersey State Senator, who specialized in transportation issues while serving in both houses of the New Jersey Legislature. River Line service began on March 15, 2004.

The station is the planned northern terminus of the Glassboro–Camden Line, an  diesel multiple unit (DMU) light rail system projected for completion in 2028.

In October 2021, NJ Transit announced plans to replace the facility with a new one, awarding a contract to conduct conceptual design, preliminary and final engineering and construction assistance services to HNTB.

Train service

Bus service 
The transportation center is served by several New Jersey Transit bus routes  and 551.

It is also served by Greyhound Lines and a South Jersey Transportation Authority shuttle to the Pureland Industrial Complex.

Notable places nearby 
The station is within walking distance of the following notable places:
 Cooper University Hospital
 Freedom Mortgage Pavilion
 Walt Whitman House

References

External links 

Broadway (PATCO)
Walter Rand T.C. (GlassboroCamdenLine.com)
Greyhound Camden Terminal

PATCO Speedline stations in New Jersey
River Line stations
Buildings and structures in Camden, New Jersey
Railway stations in the United States opened in 1936
Transit hubs serving New Jersey
Transportation buildings and structures in Camden County, New Jersey
Transportation in Camden, New Jersey
NJ Transit bus stations
Railway stations located underground in New Jersey